"Rivers of My Fathers" is a song by American vocalist Gil Scott-Heron and keyboardist Brian Jackson. It was written and composed by Scott-Heron and Jackson for their first collaborative album, Winter in America (1974). The song was recorded on October 15, 1973 at D&B Sound Studio in Silver Spring, Maryland and produced by Scott-Heron and Jackson with assistance from engineer Jose Williams.

"Rivers of My Fathers" is a soul song with a jazz arrangement. Scott-Heron's Afrocentric lyrics make references to African-American cultural roots and slavery. Although it was not released as a single, the song was recognized by writers for its instrumentation and theme of cultural significance, and regarded as one of Scott-Heron's best compositions.

Composition

Musical style

"Rivers of My Fathers" is a soul song, performed with a jazz-based arrangement spanning over eight minutes; the longest track issued on Winter in America. Recorded on October 15, 1973 at D&B Sound Studio in Silver Spring, Maryland, the session for the song, as well as Winter, featured a scaled-down lineup of Gil Scott-Heron and Brian Jackson, with drummer Bob Adams and bassist Danny Bowens, as well as a limited personnel for production. With Scott-Heron, Jackson and audio engineer Jose Williams heading production, these circumstances provided an effective forum for a reliance on strong African and R&B influences during the conception of "Rivers of My Fathers". Scott-Heron and Jackson were credited as Perpis-Fall Music, Inc. The song opens with swing-styled rim shots by Bob Adams. The opening instrumentation continues into the first two minutes, before Scott-Heron enters with vocals. Usually a spoken word performer, Scott-Heron's baritone voice accompanies and adds weight to the dark groove by vocalizing poetry, providing the lyrical subject matter to the composition.

Lyrical theme
Similar to the lyrical themes predominant on Winter in America, Scott-Heron's lyrics are Afrocentric and focus on cultural identity through the use of metaphor. Illustrating the significance of ancestry and cultural roots, "Rivers of My Fathers" features the water motif, a common metaphor in African-American culture, which evokes feelings of home and freedom, to represent faith amid the frustrations of a modern black man. As a metaphor, water was also used to hold the promise of freedom; runaway slaves used the rivers during slavery in the United States both as markers of direction and as a method of disguising their scent from hound dogs.

As the opening verse and chorus suggest, "Looking for a way out of this confusion/I'm looking for a sign, carry me home/Let me lay down by a stream and let me be miles from everything/Rivers of my fathers, could you carry me home." In his interpretation of Scott-Heron's lyrics, music writer and author Mtume ya Salaam explained "Gil sings of 'looking for a way out' out of the cold, hard city; he wants to 'lay down by a stream' that is 'miles away from everything.' But he’s too far away from home, there is no way out—instead of warm, open fields and flowing waters, there is only brick, asphalt and mortar." Following several vocal deliveries of whole choruses, the narrator pleads to the "river" to take him home, which is revealed at closing seconds of the song as Scott-Heron silently says "Africa".

Interpretation
Due to its lyrical content, critics and music writers have made interpretations and comparisons of the song to Toni Morrison's 1977 novel Song of Solomon, as their themes both adhere to ancestral and cultural identity. Writer Mtume ya Salaam has also made this comparison, as he later stated in an article for the website Kalamu:

In addition to its recognition for the literary allusion to Songs of Solomon, "Rivers of My Fathers" has been recognized by critics and music writers as one of Winter in America's best recordings, as well as one of Gil Scott-Heron's best compositions.

Personnel
Credits adapted from album liner notes.

 Gil Scott-Heron – vocals, producer
 Brian Jackson – piano
 Danny Bowens – fender bass
 Bob Adams – drums (traps)
 Jose Williams – engineer, production assistance

References

Bibliography

External links
 

1974 songs
Gil Scott-Heron songs